Broadbeach is a suburb in the City of Gold Coast, Queensland, Australia.

Geography 
Development in the area today mostly incorporates low rise structures, consisting of single bedroom houses and apartment blocks. Much of the suburb consists of canal waterways, including Lake Intrepid that are linked to the Nerang River.

The suburb contains a major road intersection between Nerang - Broadbeach Road and the Gold Coast Highway.

History 
In circa 1924, 70 allotments were advertised as "Mermaid Beach Estate" located at Mermaid Beach and Broadbeach to be auctioned by R. G. Oates Estates. The estate map has 3 estates for sale at Mermaid Beach and Broadbeach. The estates were divided in two by the "New Coastal Road" running through the Gold Coast.

While residential housing lots were selling successfully in the state government developed Broadbeach township from 1934, and the area had good bitumen roads that were described as 'speedways' in newspaper reports, it wasn't until the construction of Lennon's Broadbeach Hotel (now the site of the Oasis Hotel and Shopping Centre) in 1955 - 1956 that development of the area as a holiday destination began to increase.

Broadbeach State School opened on 16 May 1960.

Demographics

The next most common countries of birth were New Zealand 7.0% and England 4.7%. 66.8% of people spoke only English at home. The most common responses for religion were No Religion 31.0% and Catholic 20.3%.

The median age of the Broadbeach population was 46 years, higher than the national median of 38. 54.1% of people were born in Australia. The next most common countries of birth were New Zealand 5.7% and England 4.6%. 70.1% of people spoke only English at home. The most common responses for religion were no religion (38.1%) and Catholic 19.4%.

Heritage listings 
There are a number of heritage sites in Broadbeach, including:

 2684 Gold Coast Highway (Gold Coast Convention and Exhibition Centre): Seal Sculpture by Len Shillam (relocated from the former Lennon's Hotel, Broadbeach)

Seal sculpture 
In 1954 Len Shillam was commissioned to create a water fountain feature for the pool of Lennon's Hotel at Broadbeach (the first large hotel on the Gold Coast). He created a lifesize sculpture of a seal with its pup in polished terrazzo which became a much-photographed icon. After the demolition of the hotel in 1987, the sculpture was relocated to a jetty at the Sakura Japanese gardens restaurant. It later disappeared but was found at that bottom of a canal. After it was retrieved by Conrad Jupiters Casino and Bond University, it was restored and donated to the National Trust of Australia. It is now at the entrance of the Gold Coast Convention and Exhibition Centre, a short distance from the former Lennon's Hotel.

Aboriginal burial ground
In 1965, building works unearthed what was found to be an Aboriginal burial ground. An archaeological dig commenced under Laila Haglund, who was under the supervision of the University of Queensland, and the remains of more than 150 Aboriginal people of the Kombumerri clan of the Yugambeh people were moved. It was established that the people had been buried from up to 1000 years ago until the late 1800s. The excavation report was published in 1976, and described as "pioneer archaeological research". Haglund earned an MA from the University of Queensland and a PhD from Stockholm University for her work on the site.

In 1988, the remains were repatriated to the Gold Coast Aboriginal community, and reburied not far from the original burial ground. This event played an important role in the development of the state's first cultural heritage legislation, the Aboriginal Relics Preservation Act 1967 (later superseded by another Act, followed by the current Aboriginal Cultural Heritage Act 2003), which recognises the status of Indigenous Australians as the "primary guardians, keepers and knowledge holders of Australia’s ancient cultures". The event was commemorated on its 50th anniversary in 2015, hosted by the Queensland Government and the Gold Coast Historical Society, with Haglund a key speaker.

Education 
Broadbeach State School is a government primary (Prep-6) school for boys and girls on Alexandra Avenue. In 2017, the school had an enrolment of 895 students with  52 teachers (48 full-time equivalent) and 34 non-teaching staff (23 full-time equivalent). In 2018, the school had an enrolment of 947 students with 58 teachers (53 full-time equivalent) and 36 non-teaching staff (23 full-time equivalent). It includes a special education program.

There is no secondary school in Broadbeach. The nearest government secondary school is Merrimac State High School in neighbouring Mermaid Waters.

Amenities 
Oasis shopping centre is the second shopping centre in the suburb has over 100 specialty stores and a Woolworths supermarket. Oasis shopping centre has a number of restaurants located on the pedestrian section of Victoria Avenue. The centre is located across the road from the beach and is one block from the Gold Coast Highway.

The Broadbeach Surf Life Saving Club patrols the beach in the centre of the suburb.

Representing the suburb in the AFL Queensland State League and having its home ground at Merrimac Oval is the Broadbeach Australian Football Club.

Other facilities include the Broadbeach Bowls Club and the Broadbeach Surfschool which provides surfing lessons. 

Despite being called the Broadbeach Library, the Gold Coast City Council operates this public library at 61 Sunshine Boulevard in neighbouring Mermaid Waters. It opened in 2008.

There are a number of parks in the suburb, including:

 Broadbeach Park
 Cascade Gardens

 Federation Park

 Gold Coast Bulletin Centenary Park

 Herb Fennell & Noel Watson Memorial Picnic Area

 Kurrawa Park

 Mermaid Esplanade

 Moya Egerton Park

 Pratten Park

 Royal Queensland Art Society

 Victoria Park

Events 
The Blues on Broadbeach Music Festival, held in May each year is one of Australia's largest Free Blues Festivals which began in 2002 and continues to draw significant crowds each year, while remaining a free outdoor event for people of all ages to attend. Broadbeach also hosts other significant including the Groundwater Country Music Festival (July), Gold Coast Superhero Weekend (April) and the Broadbeach Christmas Carols with all events remaining free.

Attractions 

The area is also home to The Star Gold Coast (formerly Jupiters Hotel and Casino Gold Coast), the Gold Coast Convention & Exhibition Centre, and the Oasis Shopping Centre .

Broadbeach Alliance manage the precinct and present annual events and festivals such as Blues on Broadbeach Music Festival, Groundwater Country Music Festival, Gold Coast Superhero Weekend and the Broadbeach Christmas Carols.

Well known apartment blocks include Sofitel Gold Coast, The Wave, The Oracle, Beach Haven, Niecon Plaza, Hi-Ho Apartments, Belle Maison, Bel Air and Air on Broadbeach. 

The suburb of Broadbeach has  numerous shops and restaurants.

Transport

Broadbeach has two main arterial roads connecting the suburb with other parts of the Gold Coast. Gold Coast Highway runs the full length of the coast and connects all coastal suburbs with Broadbeach. Hooker Boulevard, which turns into Nerang-Broadbeach Road after a roundabout in Carrara connects the suburb with Pacific Motorway which passes through Nerang as well as Nerang railway station.

Broadbeach is serviced by Surfside Buslines services, G:link operates two light rail stations in the suburb which connects Broadbeach with the hubs of Surfers Paradise and Southport.  These are Broadbeach South and Broadbeach. Broadbeach South bus station is the main bus station in Broadbeach, which have regular and high-frequency buses that travel to Gold Coast Airport, Nerang railway station, Tweed Heads and Robina.

The Gold Coast Oceanway provides pedestrians and cyclists access along the beaches of Broadbeach.

See also

 List of Gold Coast suburbs

References

External links

 

 
Suburbs of the Gold Coast, Queensland
Entertainment districts in Australia
Coastline of Queensland